Monique Riley (born 23 November 1995) is an Australian actress, model and beauty pageant  titleholder who was crowned Miss Universe Australia 2022. She represented Australia at Miss Universe 2022 where she placed Top 16.

Early life and career
Riley was born in Sydney and originally from Queensland. She works as an executive assistant with a degree in creative industries from the Queensland University of Technology in Brisbane. She later auditioned for the National Institute of Dramatic Arts in Sydney, New South Wales.

Amid the new coronavirus (COVID-19) pandemic, which started in 2020, she worked part-time as a model and an actress in Sydney while serving as an executive assistant helping run her partner’s construction company.

Pageantry

Miss Universe Australia 2022
On July 4, 2022, Riley was introduced as one of the seven Miss Universe Australia 2022 contestants from New South Wales. On September 9, 2022, Riley competed against 36 other candidates at the Miss Universe Australia 2022 at the Warner Bros. Movie World in Gold Coast, Queensland. In the competition, Riley advanced to the Top 10 and later the Top 5, before being announced as the competition's winner and was succeeded by Daria Varlamova.

Miss Universe 2022
As Miss Universe Australia, Riley represented Australia at Miss Universe 2022. She made it to the Top 16.

References

Beauty pageant winners
1995 births
Living people
Australian models
Actors from Sydney
Australian television actors